"Dar um Jeito (We Will Find a Way)" is the official anthem of the 2014 FIFA World Cup held in Brazil performed by Carlos Santana and Wyclef Jean featuring Avicii and Alexandre Pires. The song was executive-produced and co-written by Arnon Woolfson who originated the project. It was served as an official anthem for the 2014 FIFA World Cup, with one verse in English and the other in Portuguese, and is included on the album One Love, One Rhythm – The 2014 FIFA World Cup Official Album. The song peaked at number 14 on the US Hot Dance Club Songs chart.

Charts

Weekly charts

References

2014 singles
Carlos Santana songs
Wyclef Jean songs
Avicii songs
FIFA World Cup official songs and anthems
2014 FIFA World Cup
Portuguese-language songs
2014 songs
Songs written by Rami Yacoub
Songs written by Avicii
Songs written by Wyclef Jean
Songs written by Arash Pournouri
Songs written by Carl Falk
Sony Music singles